The Maserati Kubang is a 2011 concept car unveiled at the Frankfurt Auto Show. Created under the Maserati subsidiary of Fiat, it has not been introduced for production. The Levante SUV, which is based on the Kubang, was introduced for production in 2016.

When Jeremy Clarkson, of BBC Top Gear in the United Kingdom, reviewed this car he suggested that the reason for the name was that "it's the sound the car will make the day the warranty runs out".

References

External links
Official web page

Kubang